Royal Greenwich Trust School is a free school created out of a former University Technical College which opened in the Charlton Riverside area of the Royal Borough of Greenwich in London, England in September 2013. The campus is located along the A206 near the banks of the River Thames, close to the Thames Barrier. It is adjacent to Windrush Primary School and Maryon Park.

History
The college was converted from a UTC to a free school in 2016, after the UTC closed owing to low admission numbers. The local authority were required to pick up the costs of converting to an 11-18 secondary school.

Former University Technical College
The University of Greenwich was the university sponsor of the Royal Greenwich UTC. Other sponsors included Transport for London, Wates Group and Greenwich London Borough Council. The curriculum of the UTC was structured around a series of business projects developed by the sponsors.

The UTC had an initial intake of students aged 14 and 16 (academic years 10 and 12) in 2013, and planned to expand to accommodate students aged 14 to 19 over the following two years.

It specialised in engineering and construction with underpinning themes of transport and new "green" technologies. Pupils aged 14 to 16 studied a compulsory core of GCSEs, as well additional GCSEs and BTECs that focused on engineering, construction and related fields. Sixth form students were to have options to study A Levels, BTECs and City and Guilds qualifications which were mainly focused on scientific and technical subjects.

References

External links
 

Secondary schools in the Royal Borough of Greenwich
Free schools in London
Educational institutions established in 2016
2016 establishments in England
Charlton, London